William Snowdon Robson, Baron Robson,  (10 September 1852 – 11 September 1918) was an English lawyer, judge and Liberal politician who sat in the House of Commons twice between 1885 and 1910.

Background and early life
Robson was born in Newcastle-upon-Tyne, the son of Robert Robson merchant of Newcastle-on-Tyne and his wife Emily Jane Snowden, daughter of William Snowden of Newcastle-on-Tyne. He was educated at Newcastle and at Gonville and Caius College, Cambridge. He was called to the bar by the Inner Temple in 1880 and became a Queen's Counsel in 1892.

Political career
At the 1885 general election Robson was elected Member of Parliament for Bow and Bromley and held the seat until 1886. At the 1895 general election he was elected MP for South Shields and held the seat until 1910.

Government
He was the Solicitor General from 1905 to 1908. Upon his appointment, he was knighted the same year. In 1908, he was promoted to be the Attorney General from 1908 to 1910. On 19 July 1910, he was sworn of the Privy Council.

Peerage
On 12 October 1910, Robson was made a Lord of Appeal in Ordinary and a life peer with the title Baron Robson, of Jesmond in the County of Northumberland. He was appointed to the Order of St Michael and St George as a Knight Grand Cross (GCMG) in the 1911 New Year Honours for "services in connection with the North Atlantic Coast Fisheries Arbitration". He resigned as Lord of Appeal two years later.

Family
Robson married  Catharine Burge, daughter of Charles Burge, of Portland Place, London on 26 May 1887. They had a family.

Robson died, aged 66, at Telham Court, Battle, Sussex.

Arms

References

External links 
 

1852 births
1918 deaths
Liberal Party (UK) MPs for English constituencies
UK MPs 1885–1886
UK MPs 1895–1900
UK MPs 1900–1906
UK MPs 1906–1910
UK MPs 1910
UK MPs who were granted peerages
English King's Counsel
20th-century King's Counsel
Solicitors General for England and Wales
Attorneys General for England and Wales
Knights Bachelor
Knights Grand Cross of the Order of St Michael and St George
Law lords
Alumni of Gonville and Caius College, Cambridge
Members of the Judicial Committee of the Privy Council
Members of the Privy Council of the United Kingdom
Life peers created by George V